H. P. Devitte (born 1881) was a Swiss football referee of English descent. He lived in Geneva where he was a football referee. He most notably refereed the German national football team's first ever international match on 5 April 1908, which Switzerland won 5–3 in Basel. 

Between 1908–13, he refereed at least ten senior international matches.

References

External links 
 Profile at worldreferee.com

Swiss football referees
Swiss people of English descent
Sportspeople from Geneva
1881 births
Year of death missing